"Precious Thing" is a song co-written and recorded by American country music artist Steve Wariner.  It was released in July 1990 as the second single from the album Laredo.  The song reached #8 on the Billboard Hot Country Singles & Tracks chart.  Wariner wrote the song with Mac McAnally.

Chart performance

References

1990 singles
Steve Wariner songs
Songs written by Steve Wariner
Songs written by Mac McAnally
MCA Records singles
Song recordings produced by Tony Brown (record producer)
1990 songs